Nadezhda Pavlovna Lukashevich (Brushtein)  is a Russian singer and actress. She is a member (soloist, director) of the trio Meridian, popular in the Soviet Union.

Together with other members of the trio, Nadezhda Lukashevich was recipient of the Lenin Komsomol Prize (1985) and  the honorary title Meritorious Artist of the Russian Federation (1995).

Filmography
1983: Torpedo Bombers (Торпедоносцы), as Nastya

References

External links

Living people
Soviet film actresses
Russian women singers
1949 births